Sergey Burlakov (born 26 May 1971, Taganrog, Rostov Oblast) is a Paralympic athlete, Russian political figure, and deputy of the State Duma of the 8th convocation. In 1992 Sergey Burlakov was badly injured in a car accident; and he spent the night at a temperature of -45 °C being completely immobilized. To save Burlakov's life, doctors decided to amputate his hands and legs (to the knees). After the accident, Burlakov started to engage in sport and soon became a multiple champion of Russia in swimming and athletics among Paralympic athletes.

From 2019 to 2021, he was a member of the Civic Chamber of the Russian Federation. In 2020, he was a part of the working group on the amendments to the Russian Constitution.  Since September 2021, he has served as a deputy of the 8th State Duma. He represents the Taganrog constituency

Sergey Burlakov has been married twice and has three children.

References

1971 births
Living people
United Russia politicians
21st-century Russian politicians
Eighth convocation members of the State Duma (Russian Federation)